Robert Walters (born 13 November 1955) is a former Australian rules footballer who played with Melbourne in the Victorian Football League (VFL).

Notes

External links 		
		
		
		
		
		
		
1955 births
Living people
Australian rules footballers from Victoria (Australia)		
Melbourne Football Club players